The 1954 Utah State Aggies football team was an American football team that represented Utah State University in the Skyline Conference during the 1954 college football season. In their fourth season under head coach John Roning, the Aggies compiled a 4–6 record (4–3 against Skyline opponents), placed third in the Skyline Conference, and were outscored by opponents by a total of 187 to 158.

Schedule

References

Utah State
Utah State Aggies football seasons
Utah State Aggies football